The Florists's Review is a monthly trade magazine for the retail and wholesale flower industries. It was founded in 1897 and is read in the United States and in over 80 other countries. The magazine is based in Topeka, Kansas and is published by Florists' Review Enterprises, Inc. The sister publication of the magazine is Super Floral Retailing.

References

External links
Florist's Review website – official website

Monthly magazines published in the United States
Floristry
Magazines established in 1897
Magazines published in Kansas
Mass media in Topeka, Kansas
Professional and trade magazines